Antoine Baumé (26 February 172815 October 1804) was a French chemist.

Life
He was born at Senlis. He was apprenticed to the chemist Claude Joseph Geoffroy, and in 1752 was admitted a member of the École de Pharmacie, where in the same year he was appointed professor of chemistry. The money he made in a business he carried on in Paris for dealing in chemical products enabled him to retire in 1780 in order to devote himself to applied chemistry, but, ruined in the Revolution, he was obliged to return to a commercial career.

He devised many improvements in technical processes, e.g. for bleaching silk, dyeing, gilding, purifying saltpetre, etc., but he is best known as the inventor of the Baumé scale hydrometer or "spindle" which provides scientific measurements for the density of liquids. 
The scale remains associated with his name but is often improperly spelt "Beaumé".

Of the numerous books and papers he wrote the most important is his Éléments de pharmacie théorique et pratique (9 editions, 1762–1818). He became a member of the Academy of Sciences in 1772, and an associate of the Institute in 1796. He died in Paris on 15 October 1804.

Works

 
 Eléments de Pharmacie théorique et pratique . Samson, Paris Nouvelle Ed. 1770 Digital edition /  3rd ed. 1773 Digital edition / 4th ed. 1777 Digital edition / 5th ed. 1784 Digital edition by the University and State Library Düsseldorf (9 editions, from 1762 to 1818)
 
 Manuel de chymie ou exposé des opérations de la chymie et de leurs produits, 1763
  
 Erläuterte Experimental-Chimie . Band 2 . Fritsch, Leipzig 1775 Digital edition by the University and State Library Düsseldorf

References

Attribution:

1728 births
1804 deaths
18th-century French chemists
Members of the French Academy of Sciences
People from Senlis